Ricardo Adé Kat (born 21 May 1990) is a Haitian professional footballer who plays for Ecuadorian club S.D. Aucas, as a defender.

Born in Saint-Marc, he represents Haiti at international level.

Career
Adé has played in the United States for Miami United, and in Chile for Santiago Morning.

In 2017, Adé arrived to Santiago Morning. On his first season, he played 23 matches and scored 1 goal.

He made his international debut for Haiti in 2016.

External links

References

1990 births
Living people
People from Saint-Marc
Haitian footballers
Association football defenders
Baltimore SC players
Don Bosco FC players
Santiago Morning footballers
L.D.U. Quito footballers
Ligue Haïtienne players
Primera B de Chile players
Haiti international footballers
Haitian expatriate footballers
Expatriate footballers in Chile
Expatriate soccer players in the United States
Haitian expatriate sportspeople in Chile
Haitian expatriate sportspeople in the United States
2013 CONCACAF Gold Cup players
2019 CONCACAF Gold Cup players
2021 CONCACAF Gold Cup players